The following list is the list of mayors of İzmir, Turkey, after the proclamation of Turkish republic.

Notes 

Izmir